David Vincent Hooper (31 August 1915 – 3 May 1998), born in Reigate, was a British chess player and writer.  As an amateur, he tied for fifth place in the 1949 British Championship at Felixstowe.  He was the British correspondence chess champion in 1944 and the London Chess Champion in 1948. He played in the Chess Olympiad at Helsinki in 1952.

Hooper was an expert in the chess endgame and in chess history of the nineteenth century.  He is best known for his chess writing, including The Oxford Companion to Chess (1992 with Ken Whyld), Steinitz (Hamburg 1968, in German), and A Pocket Guide to Chess Endgames (London 1950)

Books by Hooper

References

External links
 
 Obituary
 “David Hooper (1915-98)” by Edward Winter
 Remembering David Hooper (31-viii-1915 03-v-1998)

1915 births
1998 deaths
British chess players
English non-fiction writers
British chess writers
People from Reigate
English male non-fiction writers
20th-century chess players
20th-century English male writers